Alicia Penalba (August 9, 1913 – November 4, 1982) was an Argentine sculptor, tapestry designer, and weaver.

Biography
Penalba was born in San Pedro, Buenos Aires Province in 1913. She originally sought a career in drawing and painting. However, in 1950, during her stay in Paris, she decided to commit entirely to sculpture. Penalba specialized in vertical organic forms and drew inspiration from fellow sculptors Etienne Martin and Etienne Hajdu. Her works are part of the non-figurative abstract art movement and tie in with the work of Martin, Hajdu, François Stahly, Karl-Jean Longuet, Simone Boisecq and Marta Colvin who staged a renewal of the sculptural form from 1950. By the 1960s, her artwork shifted slightly toward sculptures of a more horizontal orientation. While she created many sculptures of all shapes and sizes, she is best known for her monumental pieces that can be found all over the world. Her statue, The Great Double (Le Grand Double; 1962–1964) is included in the sculpture garden of the Kröller-Müller Museum in Otterlo, Netherlands, while her 1972 version is displayed outside the MGIC building in Milwaukee, Wisconsin, US.  In 1974, while working in Pietrasanta, Panalba, encouraged Helaine Blumenfeld to try sculpting in marble and introduced her to master carver Sem Ghelardini. Penalba died in Paris in 1982.

Awards
Prize, Calouste Gulbenkian Foundation, Paris, France (1974)
Special Prize, Hakone First International Exhibition of Modern Sculpture, Ninotaira, Japan (1969)
International Sculpture Prize, Sixth Biennial, São Paulo, Brazil (1961)

References

External links 

 Alicia Penalba Online Catalogue (launch January 2023)

 Alicia Penalba Research Center (artseller catalogue)
 
 Alicia Penalba website

1913 births
1982 deaths
20th-century Argentine women artists
20th-century sculptors
Argentine women sculptors
Argentine sculptors
Alumni of the Académie de la Grande Chaumière
People from Buenos Aires Province